Gary Walton (born 17 April 1959) is a New Zealand cricketer. He played in seven first-class matches for Central Districts from 1985 to 1988.

See also
 List of Central Districts representative cricketers

References

External links
 

1959 births
Living people
New Zealand cricketers
Central Districts cricketers
Cricketers from Nelson, New Zealand